Probable RNA-binding protein 23 is a protein that in humans is encoded by the RBM23 gene.

Function 

This gene encodes a member of the U2AF-like family of RNA binding proteins. This protein interacts with some steroid nuclear receptors, localizes to the promoter of a steroid- responsive gene, and increases transcription of steroid-responsive transcriptional reporters in a hormone-dependent manner. It is also implicated in the steroid receptor-dependent regulation of alternative splicing. Multiple transcript variants encoding different isoforms have been found for this gene.

References

Further reading

External links